Cibo Matto is the debut EP by Cibo Matto released in 1995.

Three tracks from this release were later included in the group's debut full-length album with slightly different arrangements (substantially in the case of "Know Your Chicken") and cleaner, better-produced vocal takes. The EP also features a cover of alternative rock band Soundgarden's 1994 song "Black Hole Sun", which Allmusic describes as "a wonderfully loopy cover... rearranged like a lounge favorite and sung in French".

The final track, the instrumental "Crumbs" would later appear on the group's second EP, 1997's Super Relax.

In Japan the album sold 20,000 copies.

Track listing
"Beef Jerky"
"Birthday Cake"
"Know Your Chicken"
"Black Hole Sun" (Soundgarden)
"Crumbs"

Notes

1995 debut EPs
Cibo Matto albums